The 1856 Missouri gubernatorial election was held on August 2, 1852, the Democratic nominee, Trusten Polk, defeated Know-Nothing candidate Robert C. Ewing (running under the American Party label), and former Senator Thomas H. Benton.  Benton ran as an Independent Democrat under the label "Benton Democrat."

In February 1857, Trusten Polk would be elected to the United States Senate; he therefore resigned the governorship, was replaced by Lt. Gov. Hancock Lee Jackson, and forced a special election to be called for August 1857 to fill the remainder of the term.

Results

References

Missouri
1856
Gubernatorial
August 1856 events